Kherdi is a census town in Ratnagiri in the Indian state of Maharashtra. It has Maharashtra Industrial Development Corporation (MIDC).

Demographics
 India census, Kherdi had a population of 10,703. Males constitute 53% of the population and females 47%. Kherdi has an average literacy rate of 75%, higher than the national average of 59.5%: male literacy is 79%, and female literacy is 70%. In Kherdi, 15% of the population is under 6 years of age.

References

Cities and towns in Raigad district